In 2010 an African-American teenager in Baltimore, Maryland was beaten by two white Orthodox Jewish men in the neighborhood of Upper Park Heights. Authorities accused two brothers from Cheswolde, Eliyahu and Avi Werdesheim, respectively 24 and 22 years of age, of beating the teenager after receiving reports of suspicious behavior from an Orthodox Jewish neighborhood watch group. Eliyahu received convictions of false imprisonment and second degree assault. He was acquitted of the charge of carrying a deadly weapon with intent to injure. Avi was acquitted of all three charges.

Several observers compared this beating to the Trayvon Martin shooting case in Florida. Because of the publicity of the Martin case, the Werdesheim brothers had put forward a motion to move the trial, because of fears that it would be difficult to find an impartial jury. The brothers withdrew the motion and instead selected a bench trial.

See also
Racism in Jewish communities

References

External links
"Judge won’t drop charges in Baltimore beating case." Associated Press at The Washington Post. May 2, 2012.

2010 in Maryland
2010s in Baltimore
African-American history in Baltimore
African American–Jewish relations
Anti-black racism in Maryland
Crimes in Baltimore
Orthodox Judaism in Baltimore
Park Heights, Baltimore
Racially motivated violence against African Americans